Balidaan (Sacrifice) is a 1997 Nepali historical drama film, directed by Tulsi Ghimire, and written by Modanath Prasrit. It was produced by Shyam Sapkota under the banner of Cinema Nepal. The film is set in Panchayat-era Nepal, and depicts a fictionalised version of the contemporary democracy movement. It features Hari Bansha Acharya in the lead role, alongside Anjali Lama, Madan Krishna Shrestha, Shanti Maskey, Keshav Bhattarai, Laxmi Giri and Neer Shah. The film was a critical and commercial success.

In 2005, Balidaan was banned by the short-lived autocratic government headed by King Gyanendra for its portrayal of Nepal's communist movement.

Plot 
One day a rebel dies after a conflict with the police officers on a campus. Bikram (B.S. Rana), the leader of the revolutionary group, expresses his sorrow for the rebel who died and sends other revolutionaries underground to hide from the police; they disperse in different areas of Nepal. Sangita (Anjali Lama) reaches Sirani village where she gets to meet Arjun (Hari Bansha Acharya), a young student. She informs him that Bikram has been arrested. Arjun works on their agenda to raise awareness to other people about their rights via their songs.

The group is preparing for their revolution against the Panchayat system. Arjun and Sangita visit another village to raise awareness about democracy. On the way, they meet a retired captain (Madan Krishna Shrestha) who is not convinced by their plan. The captain tries to persuade the head of the village to allow inter-caste marriage but the head of the village refutes the idea. The captain tells the revolutionary group to perform an inter-caste marriage to convince the head of the village. Arjun and Sangita decide to marry each other, but another member of the group secretly loves her. He betrays the group and tells the police of their plan.

Arjun is arrested and tortured by Senior Police Inspector Karna (Neer Shah). He is sentenced to 10 years in jail by the court. While walking out of the court, he spits on the minister who demanded the death penalty. Later, Karna is impressed by Arjun's beliefs. The officer tells him that if he will reveal the names of those who are involved in the revolutionary group they will release him, but he refuses. While Arjun is being transferred to the Palpa prison, he breaks free from the police car. The police then break up a fight between the revolutionaries and Arjun dies. Sangita gives birth to a child at the fight scene and the film ends with a song relating that Arjun gave up his life for the nation.

Cast 

 Hari Bansha Acharya as Arjun
 Anjali Lama as Sangita
 Keshav Bhattarai as Keshav
 B.S. Rana as Bikram Sir
 Neer Shah as SP Karna Dhoj
 Madan Krishna Shrestha as Retired Captain
 Laxmi Giri as Arjun's Mother
 Rajaram Poudel as Police officer
 Ramchandra Adhikari as Hawaldar Chandra Bahadur
 Kiran K.C. as Bohora Sir
 Ram Krishna Bajgain as Sagar
 Shanti Maskey as Sumita's Mother

Soundtrack

Banning 
The film was released in 1997. In September 2005, it was banned by the government of Nepal for its portrayal of Nepal's communist movement. Sudeshna Sarkar of Two Circles wrote: "Balidan portrayed the Communist movement of Nepal and was banned five years ago when King Gyanendra seized absolute power with the help of the army and jailed Nepal's top politicians". The song "Gaun Gaun Bata Utha" was adopted by the Communist Party of Nepal (Unified Marxist–Leninist). It was previously released during the Panchayat era, composed by Shyam Tamot, and had been banned from state-owned Radio Nepal. Balidaan became a blockbuster, and was praised by the audiences for its revolutionary theme, and for the film's touching songs.

In May 2015, the film was screened on satellite television station Dish Home.

Critical reception 
The staff of NepaliSansar cited the film as one of the "best Nepali movies ever", alongside Chino, Darpan Chhaya, Kusume Rumal, Lahure, and Desh. Kamal Subedi of Republica said: "Balidan is one of the successful movies of all time". The staff of BossNepal wrote: "It is a good movie to catch up if you are willing to get a glimpse of what surpassed among the people of Nepal during the democratic movement". The staff of La.Lit wrote: "Balidan, [...] was a tearjerker perfectly poised between the fall of Panchayat and the start of the Maoist revolution".

References

External links 
 

1990s historical drama films
1997 films
1997 drama films
Films banned in Nepal
Nepalese historical films
Films directed by Tulsi Ghimire